Buleleng is a district in Buleleng Regency, Bali, Indonesia.

References

Districts of Bali